Saurita tristissima is a moth in the subfamily Arctiinae. It was described by Perty in 1834. It is found in the Amazon region.

References

Moths described in 1834
Saurita